You're the Man the fourth posthumous studio album by American singer Marvin Gaye, originally intended to be released in 1972 as the follow-up to What's Going On. It was released on March 29, 2019, through Motown, Universal Music Enterprises, and Universal Music Group to celebrate what would have been Gaye's 80th birthday on April 2, 2019. The album includes the single of the same name, as well as the intended original album in full and other songs Gaye recorded at the time.

Salaam Remi's remix of "My Last Chance" was released in promotion of the album on February 8, 2019.

Motown followed this release with What's Going On Live a few months later.

Background and release
You're the Man was intended as another socially conscious record like What's Going On (1971), but following the release of its lead single, the title track "You're the Man", Gaye cancelled its release. This was in part due to the reception of the song, as well as the fact that Gaye's political views were different from those of Motown founder Berry Gordy. For these reasons, You're the Man was long considered a "lost" album.

Fifteen of the songs were not released on vinyl in the 1970s, but most were made available on CD compilations over the years. A longer take of "I Want to Come Home for Christmas" was first made available in 1990 after being recorded in 1972. The album includes liner notes written by David Ritz.

Reception
 With 11critics, Album of the Year considered the critical consensus a 75 out of 100 and AnyDecentMusic? summed up 12reviews as a 7.5 out of 10.

Track listing

Charts

References

2019 albums
Albums published posthumously
Marvin Gaye albums
Albums produced by Marvin Gaye
Albums produced by Hal Davis
Albums produced by Freddie Perren
Motown albums
Universal Music Enterprises albums
Albums produced by Pam Sawyer
Albums produced by Willie Hutch